"I Understand" is a popular song with music by Mabel Wayne and lyrics by Kim Gannon. It was published in 1941.

It has been recorded by:
 Jimmy Dorsey and His Orchestra (vocal by Bob Eberly). This reached the No. 11 position in the Billboard charts in 1941.
 Fats Waller - recorded May 13, 1941 for Bluebird records (catalog No. 11175A).
 Harry James and His Orchestra (vocal by Buddy DiVito), recorded November 6, 1947 for Columbia Records (catalog No. 38059).
 The Four Aces - recorded for Decca Records (catalog No. 28162) (1952).
 Keely Smith - I Wish You Love (1957)
 Nat "King" Cole - in his album Just One of Those Things (1957)
 Kenny Dorham - This Is the Moment! (1958)
 The Four Freshmen - The Four Freshmen and Five Guitars (1959)
 Dinah Washington - Unforgettable (1959)
 Stan Kenton on The Romantic Approach (1961)
 Lena Horne - for her album Lena...Lovely and Alive (1962)
 Sarah Vaughan - included in the album Sarah + 2 (1962)
 The Hollies - (1963)
 Ray Conniff and His Orchestra and Chorus - Friendly Persuasion (1964).
 The Ink Spots - Best of the Ink Spots (1979).
 Dave Brubeck - Just You, Just Me (1994)

References

Songs with music by Mabel Wayne
Songs with lyrics by Kim Gannon
1941 songs
Bluebird Records singles